= Sandra Scolnik =

American artist

Sandra Michelle Scolnik (born 1968) is an American artist. Her work is included in the collections of the Whitney Museum of American Art and the San Francisco Museum of Modern Art.

== Education ==
Scolnik received her MFA from SUNY Albany.
